Tour of the Universe was a 2009–2010 worldwide concert tour by English electronic band Depeche Mode in support of the group's 12th studio album, Sounds of the Universe, which was released in April 2009.

The Live Nation-produced tour, which was announced in October 2008 in Berlin, kicked off with a warm-up show in Esch-sur-Alzette, Luxembourg in May 2009. By the end of the year, the tour had reached Europe, Asia, North America and South America.

The concerts in Barcelona, Spain were filmed for the video release Tour of the Universe: Barcelona 20/21.11.09, which was released on 8 November 2010 in Europe and 9 November 2010 in North America on DVD and Blu-ray Disc.

Overview

The tour commenced in May 2009 with a warm-up show in Esch-sur-Alzette, Luxembourg, followed by the first full-fledged date in the Tel Aviv District city of Ramat Gan, Israel. The tour was disrupted as lead singer Dave Gahan was struck by a severe bout of gastroenteritis, which occurred before the band were to take to the stage in Athens. Following subsequent cancellations of eight further shows, the tour was eventually confirmed to recommence in June while Gahan reportedly flew to the United States for treatment; a low-grade malignant tumour in his bladder was found and successfully removed. Although a portion of the cancelled dates were rescheduled, the band's appearance at the Pinkpop Festival in the Netherlands was pulled, while all remaining dates and one of two dates in Leipzig, Germany were cancelled indefinitely due to "scheduling conflicts".

In June 2009, the band played their first show following Gahan's illness in Leipzig, resuming a European leg which eventually wrapped up in Bilbao, Spain. The tour was cut short after Gahan tore a calf muscle, forcing the cancellation of two dates in Porto, Portugal and Seville, Spain respectively.

In July 2009, the group began a tour of the U.S. and Canada. The leg, which featured a headline slot at the Lollapalooza Festival in Chicago, started in Toronto and culminated in Fort Lauderdale, Florida in early September. In August, two dates in California were cancelled after Gahan received doctor's orders to serve a period of complete vocal rest.

In October 2009, the band returned to North America to play four dates in Mexico. The leg continued on to Costa Rica and South America, their first shows in these territories since the Exotic Tour in 1994. The group received attention in the media following the group's performance in Peru after it was reported that Gahan thanked the wrong country. According to reports, Gahan said: "Thank you very much, Chile" towards the end of the concert held in Lima. However, this claim was later disputed by a band representative, who quoted Gahan as saying: "Thank you very much, good night" instead. The leg eventually finished up in Buenos Aires. Later in the month, the act began a European leg of indoor venues, which kicked off in Oberhausen, Germany and culminated mid-December in Manchester, United Kingdom.

In January 2010, the group commenced a third European leg in Berlin. The leg included five shows that were rescheduled following Gahan's illness in the summer of 2009. The tour also included a date as part of a series of concerts in aid of Teenage Cancer Trust, which was held at the Royal Albert Hall in London. During this concert, the performances of "Home", "One Caress" and "Come Back" were accompanied by a seven-piece string section. Additionally, during the encore, former band member Alan Wilder made a surprise appearance onstage, accompanying Martin Gore's performance of "Somebody" on piano. It was the first time Wilder had performed with the band in more than fifteen years, having exited the group in 1995. Speaking about the event, Wilder said that he was "happy to accept" Gahan's proposal to join the group onstage and stated that "[they] were long overdue some kind of reunion of this sort". The entire tour eventually wrapped up in Düsseldorf, Germany in late February, after ten months and 102 shows in 32 countries. In total, the band performed to more than 2.7 million people. As reported by music industry publication Billboard, the tour was one of the most profitable in 2009, ending 20th in the magazine's "Top Tours" list.

Similar to the group's previous tour, Touring the Angel, recordings of some of the tour's concerts were made available on double CD format or as a digital download under the generic name Recording the Universe. A video release of the live concerts held at Palau Sant Jordi in Barcelona, Spain, titled Tour of the Universe: Barcelona 20/21.11.09, was released on 8 November 2010 in Europe and 9 November 2010 in North America on DVD and Blu-ray Disc. The DVD release was issued in two formats, "Deluxe" and "Super Deluxe", which both include two audio CDs of the live concerts. The "Super Deluxe" edition also includes a second DVD featuring the tour documentary, "Inside the Universe", as well as extra bonus materials.

Setlist
General setlist for Europe, Leg #2 and #3

 Intro (Excerpt from "In Chains")
 "In Chains"
 "Wrong"
 "Hole to Feed"
 "Walking in My Shoes"
 "It's No Good"
 "A Question of Time"
 "World In My Eyes"
 "Precious"
 "Fly on the Windscreen"

 Song performed by Martin Gore
 "Freelove"
 "Clean" (Bare version)
 "Dressed in Black" (Acoustic)
 "Sister of Night"
 "Jezebel"
 "Insight" (Acoustic)
 "Judas" (Acoustic)
 "One Caress"
 Song performed by Martin Gore
 "Home" (Acoustic)

 "Miles Away/The Truth Is"
 "Come Back"
 "Policy of Truth"
 "In Your Room" (Zephyr Mix (With bits from the album version))
 "I Feel You"
 "Enjoy the Silence"
 "Never Let Me Down Again"

 Song performed by Martin Gore
 "Somebody"
 "A Question of Lust" (Acoustic)
 "Dressed in Black" (Acoustic)
 "One Caress"
  "Stripped"

 "Behind the Wheel"
 "Photographic"
 "Personal Jesus

Note: Setlists differed between dates, with rotated songs (denoted above), possible minor song order changes and song omissions.

Tour dates

Support acts

 Angele Phase (Bogotá)
 Dolcenera (Milan)
 Feedbackers (Lima)
 Gomo (Lisbon)
 The Horrors (London (17 February 2010))
 Lavagance (Bratislava)
 M83 (8–18 June 2009; 27 and 28 June 2009)
 MOTOR (6 May 2009; 22–25 June 2009; 30 June – 8 July 2009)
 Nitzer Ebb (9 January – 27 February 2010, excl. 17 February 2010 (London))

 Terry Poison (Tel Aviv)
 Peter Bjorn and John (24 July – 5 September 2009)
 Polarkreis 18 (Leipzig and Berlin (10 June 2009))
 Quiero Club (Mexico City (3 October 2009))
 The Raveonettes (Mexico City (4 October 2009))
 Soulsavers (31 October – 18 December 2009, excl. 14 November 2009 (Lisbon))
 Yeah Yeah Yeahs (Tel Aviv)
 Žagar (Budapest (23 June 2009))

Musicians

Depeche Mode
David Gahan – lead vocals
Martin Gore – guitar, synthesizers, lead and backing vocals
Andrew Fletcher – synthesizers

Backup musicians
Peter Gordeno – synthesizers, piano, backing vocals
Christian Eigner – drums, synthesizers

References

External links

 Official site
 Official tour blog

Depeche Mode concert tours
2009 concert tours
2010 concert tours
Concerts at Malmö Arena